The Town of Hooper is a Statutory Town located in the San Luis Valley in Alamosa County, Colorado, United States.  The population was 103 at the 2010 census.

Geography
Hooper is located at  (37.745819, -105.876817).

Nearby points of interest include the Great Sand Dunes National Park and the town of Crestone.

History
The post office at Hooper was known as Garrison from January 26, 1891 until July 17, 1896. The present name honors Major S. Hooper, a railroad official. Hooper was in Costilla County, Colorado until March 8, 1913, when the formation of Alamosa County was authorized by the state legislature.

Demographics

As of the census of 2000, there were 123 people, 48 households, and 33 families residing in the town. The racial makeup of the town was 81.30% White, 3.25% Native American, 11.38% from other races, and 4.07% from two or more races. Hispanic or Latino of any race were 18.70% of the population.

There were 48 households, out of which 35.4% had children under the age of 18 living with them, 56.3% were married couples living together, 8.3% had a female householder with no husband present, and 29.2% were non-families. 25.0% of all households were made up of individuals, and 10.4% had someone living alone who was 65 years of age or older. The average household size was 2.56 and the average family size was 3.12.

In the town, the population was spread out, with 28.5% under the age of 18, 8.9% from 18 to 24, 30.1% from 25 to 44, 19.5% from 45 to 64, and 13.0% who were 65 years of age or older. The median age was 41 years. For every 100 females, there were 108.5 males. For every 100 females age 18 and over, there were 95.6 males.

The median income for a household in the town was $31,964, and the median income for a family was $35,833. Males had a median income of $33,333 versus $19,750 for females. The per capita income for the town was $13,897. There were 12.5% of families and 21.0% of the population living below the poverty line, including 34.9% of under eighteens and 10.0% of those over 64.

Gallery

See also

Outline of Colorado
Index of Colorado-related articles
State of Colorado
Colorado cities and towns
Colorado municipalities
Colorado counties
Alamosa County, Colorado
Great Sand Dunes National Park and Preserve
San Luis Valley
Sangre de Cristo Range

References

Further reading
Melvin McAllister, Life in Hooper, Colorado, self-published (1998), 211 pages

External links
Town of Hooper contacts
CDOT map of the Town of Hooper
May 2006 Photos of Hooper, Colorado

Towns in Alamosa County, Colorado
Towns in Colorado